St Michael's College is a Catholic school located in the western suburbs of Adelaide, South Australia. The college consists of two campuses; a primary campus located at Beverley for students in Reception to Year 6, and a secondary campus at Henley Beach for students in Year 7 to Year 12. It is a coeducational school that originated as a single-sex school for boys.

Notable alumni

Greg Anderson, Australian rules footballer
Leon Bignell, politician
Matthew Broadbent, Australian rules footballer
Darren Cahill, tennis player
Scott Camporeale, Australian rules footballer
Chris Dittmar, squash player
Brad Ebert, Australian rules footballer
Brett Ebert, Australian rules footballer
Rachael Killian, Australian rules footballer
Matthew Kluzek, Australian rules footballer
Robert Lau, politician
Matthew Lokan, Australian rules footballer
Tkay Maidza, rapper
Ebony Marinoff, Australian rules footballer
Chris McHugh, volleyballer
Harry Nielsen, cricketer
Chadd Sayers, cricketer
Jimmy Toumpas, Australian rules footballer
Scott Thompson, Australian rules footballer
Maddy Turner, netballer
Warren Tredrea, Australian rules footballer
Michael Wilson, Australian rules footballer

See also
 Catholic education in Australia
 List of schools in South Australia

References

External links
Official website

Catholic secondary schools in Adelaide
Educational institutions established in 1954
Adelaide
1954 establishments in Australia